HNK Rijeka is a Croatian association football club based in Rijeka, which currently competes in the top tier division of Croatian football, Prva HNL. Founded in 1946, they have been a member of Yugoslav First League for 29 out of 45 seasons until its dissolution in 1991, including the last 17 seasons. Following the breakup of Yugoslavia, the club joined the Croatian First League in its inaugural season in 1992, and is one of four founding members that have never been relegated.

Rijeka has competed in a number of nationally contested leagues and cup tournaments, and their record against each club faced in these competitions is listed below. Rijeka played their inaugural Yugoslav First League fixture against 14. Oktobar Niš on 25 August 1946. They have faced 41 different sides in Yugoslav First League. Rijeka have faced 73 different clubs in Yugoslav Second League and in the third tier of Yugoslav league system. In 31 Yugoslav Cup participations, Rijeka have faced 50 clubs. The club played their inaugural league fixture as part of the Croatian First Football League on 29 February 1992 against Šibenik. Since 1992, they have faced 39 different sides in Prva HNL with their most regular opponent having been Hajduk Split and Osijek. In the Croatian Football Cup, Rijeka have faced 55 different clubs.

Key
The records include the results of matches played in the Yugoslav First League (1946–47, 1958–69 and 1974–91), Yugoslav Second League and lower tiers (1947–58 and 1969–74), Yugoslav Cup (1947–91), Croatian First Football League (1992–) and Croatian Football Cup (1992–).
  Clubs with this background and symbol in the "Opponent" column are Rijeka's divisional rivals in the current season.
  Clubs with this background and symbol in the "Opponent" column are defunct.
The name used for each opponent is the name they had when Rijeka most recently played a match against them. Results against each opponent include results against that club under any former name. For example, results against Dinamo Zagreb include matches played against Croatia Zagreb.
P = matches played; W = matches won; D = matches drawn; L = matches lost; F = goals for; A = goals against; Win% = percentage of total matches won.
The columns headed "First" and "Last" contain the first and most recent seasons in which Rijeka played a match against each opponent.

Croatian First Football League all-time record (1992–)
Updated 13 November 2022.

Croatian Football Cup all-time record (1992–)
Updated 9 November 2022.

Yugoslav First League all-time record (1946–47, 1958–69 and 1974–91)

Yugoslav First League qualifiers all-time record (1946–47, 1947–48, 1952, 1957–58, 1967–68 and 1969–72)

Yugoslav Second League (1947–48, 1950–53, 1955–58 and 1969–74) and third tier (1948–49 and 1953–55) all-time record

Yugoslav Cup all-time record (1947–91)

Overall record (by club)
The list only includes clubs that Rijeka have faced in 10 or more official matches. Updated 13 November 2022.

Overall record (by competition)
Includes European matches. Updated 13 November 2022.

Sources: Yugoslav Football Statistics, Croatian Football Statistics.
P = Matches played; W = Matches won; D = Matches drawn; L = Matches lost; GF = Goals for; GA = Goals against. Defunct competitions indicated in italics.

Notes

References
 

Record By Opponent
Rijeka
Rijeka